Kim David Henkel (born January 19, 1946) is an American screenwriter, director, producer, and actor. He is best known as the co-writer of Tobe Hooper's horror film The Texas Chain Saw Massacre.

Early life 
Henkel was born in Virginia and grew up in several small towns in South Texas. He began his university studies at the University of Texas at Austin in 1964 majoring in English. He graduated in 1969. Mutual friends introduced Henkel to Tobe Hooper and Henkel acted in Hooper's first feature film, Eggshells (1969).

Career 
Henkel and Hooper co-wrote the original The Texas Chain Saw Massacre screenplay. Henkel both wrote and directed a sequel, Texas Chainsaw Massacre: The Next Generation (1995). He also wrote and co-produced the Eagle Pennell classic Last Night at the Alamo (1983) as well as the adaptation for Hooper's Eaten Alive (1977).

Henkel returned to the horror genre in 2012 with another tale of cannibals titled Butcher Boys, which was co-directed by two of his former film students Duane Graves and Justin Meeks. Henkel had previously worked with the pair as a producer on their debut feature The Wild Man of the Navidad. Most recently, he produced the  horror film Found Footage 3D, which was released on the horror streaming service Shudder in 2017.

He has been a lecturer in screenwriting at Rice University.

Filmography

References

External links 

1946 births
Living people
American male screenwriters
American film directors
American film producers
Texas A&M University System
Rice University staff
Screenwriting instructors
University of Texas at Austin College of Liberal Arts alumni
Horror film directors
Screenwriters from Virginia
Screenwriters from Texas
20th-century American screenwriters
20th-century American male writers
21st-century American male writers
21st-century American screenwriters